The Danish National School of Performing Arts (Danish: Den Danske Scenekunstskole) is an artistic educational institution governed by the Danish Ministry of Culture. The school offers higher education and continuing education within performing arts. Based in Denmark, the school has campuses in Aarhus, Fredericia, Copenhagen and Odense.

History 
The Danish National School of Performing Arts (DASPA) was established in 2015 when all the Danish performing arts educations were unified in one school. Former performance institutions included  Aarhus Theatre School, Odense Teater school, Aarhus Theater Playwright School, The Danish Musical Academy in Fredericia, Odsherred Theater School and the National Performing Arts School.
The School offers educational programmes at BA, MFA, and diploma level.

Programmes

Programmes at Bachelor Level 
 Acting 
 Dance and Choreography 
 Musical Theatre 
 Theatre and Performance Making (Lighting, Playwriting, Scenography, Sound, Stage Directing)
 Performing Arts Production (Management, Stagecraft)

Programmes at Master Level 
 Master of Fine Arts in Performing Arts 
 Master of Fine Arts in Choreography
 Master of Fine Arts in Playwriting. 
 Masters of Fine Arts in Directing.
 Masters of Fine Arts in Acting. 
 Master of Fine Arts in Dance and Participation

Programmes at Diploma Level 

 Diploma in Creative Producing and Cultural Leadership

Notable alumni

Pilou Asbæk
Claes Bang
Kim Bodnia
Lars Bom
Nicolas Bro
Angela Bundalovic
Nikolaj Coster-Waldau
Jessica Dinnage
Trine Dyrholm
Mikkel Følsgaard
Peter Gantzler
Anne Louise Hassing
Lars Mikkelsen
Birthe Neumann
Naja Salto
Patricia Schumann
Charlotte Sieling
Birgitte Hjort Sørensen
Morten Suurballe
Ulrich Thomsen
May el-Toukhy

References

External links
The Danish National School of Performing Arts website

Performing arts education in Copenhagen
Theatre in Denmark